The Mayor of Richmond is the chief executive of the government of Richmond, Virginia, as stipulated by the city's charter.

This list includes mayors who were appointed by the Richmond City Council as well as those who were elected by popular vote.

The current Mayor of Richmond and 80th in the sequence of regular officeholders is Democrat Levar Stoney who succeeded Dwight C. Jones, a Baptist pastor and former member of the Virginia House of Delegates in 2016. Jones was first elected in 2008, and won a second term in November 2012.

History

The City of Richmond was founded in 1737 by William Byrd II. 

In May 1782, the Virginia General Assembly expressed desire to move inland, to a place less exposed to British incursions than Williamsburg. Richmond had been made the temporary capital after urging from Thomas Jefferson years earlier, and it was soon decided to make the move permanent. 

Two months later, on July 2nd, a charter was written up, and the city was incorporated. Twelve men were to be elected from the City at-large and were to select one of their own to act as Mayor, another to serve as Recorder and four to serve as Aldermen. The remaining six were to serve as members of the Common Council. All positions had term limits of three years, with the exception of the mayor who could only serve one year consecutively. A vote was held at a meeting the following day and Dr. William Foushee, Sr. was chosen as the first mayor.

In March 1851, the decision was made to replace the original Richmond City Charter. It was decided that all city officials were to be popularly elected. After the 12-year tenure of William Lambert and his short-term replacement by recorder Samuel T. Pulliam, elections were held, with Joseph C. Mayo coming out on top. Mayo was deposed in April 1865, weeks before the end of the American Civil War, when Union forces captured the city.

The system set forth by the Second City Charter worked as long as the city was small and most voters knew personally, the qualifications of the men for whom they were voting and the requirements for the jobs to which they were elected. Beginning in 1948, Richmond eliminated the popularly elected mayor's office, and instituted a council-manager form of government. This lasted until 2004, when the City Charter was changed once again, bringing back the popularly elected mayor. Former Virginia Gov. L. Douglas Wilder was elected mayor that year. Of Virginia's 38 cities, only Richmond does not have a council-manager form of government.

List of mayors

Appointed mayors (1782–1853)

Popularly elected mayors (1853–1948)

City Council appointed mayors (1948–2005)

Popularly-elected mayors (since 2005)

Notes

References

External links
City of Richmond: City Council 1948-Present
Political Graveyard: Mayors of Richmond

Richmond, Virginia